Hu Keming (born 1940), also known as Hu Ko-ming is a female Chinese former international table tennis player.

Table tennis career
She won a bronze medal at the 1961 World Table Tennis Championships in the women's doubles with Wang Jian and a silver medal in the Corbillon Cup (women's team) for China.

See also
 List of table tennis players
 List of World Table Tennis Championships medalists

References

Chinese female table tennis players
Table tennis players from Guangzhou
Living people
1940 births
World Table Tennis Championships medalists